Rulon Clark Allred (March 29, 1906 – May 10, 1977) was a homeopath and chiropractor in Salt Lake City and the leader of what is now the Apostolic United Brethren, a breakaway sect of polygamous Mormon fundamentalists in Utah, Colorado, and Arizona, United States. Rulon was murdered on the orders of Ervil LeBaron, the head of a rival polygamous sect.

Biography

Having turned away from the polygamous religion of his father and grandfather as a young man, Allred's decision to take plural wives came in his twenties following what he described as a vision; the decision resulted in the estrangement of his first wife, Katherine Handy.

Allred began to assume greater responsibilities in the Short Creek, Arizona, polygamous community following the paralytic stroke of its leader, Joseph White Musser. Allred was imprisoned for bigamy following Arizona governor John Howard Pyle's 1953 "Short Creek raid", but he resumed his polygamous lifestyle upon his release. During his imprisonment, he met the LeBaron group through correspondence and eventually fled to Mexico to live on their compound with promises of wealth, which never materialized. Allred ultimately assumed leadership of a polygamous group.

In his later years, Allred made no attempt to hide his polygamous beliefs and openly spoke of his adherence to the principle of plural marriage on talk shows and in print interviews. Allred was the husband of at least seven wives and the father of forty-eight children. His daughter's biography reveals that after the original seven wives, Allred was pressured by his peers to be sealed to widows and other women requesting to be bound to "their prophet". At the time of his death, he had been sealed to 16 women in total. Though extremely conservative by the standards of outsiders, Allred's sect was far more moderate than the community headed by Rulon and Warren Jeffs and certainly more so than the organization headed by LeBaron. He was not on good terms with either of the rival sects, and he began receiving death threats from the LeBaron group in the 1960s. Allred's grandson, Lance Allred, who was born in 1981 and raised in Rulon's polygamist commune of Pinesdale, Montana, was the first legally deaf player in National Basketball Association history and is now a keynote motivational speaker. Regarding his grandfather, he has stated: "In the context of polygamist leaders, Rulon was actually very liberal, in that he encouraged his followers to go out into the real world and make money and bring it back, rather than keeping them all within a compound like the Jeffs and others do." Lance Allred has also said: "Rulon was actually again, in the context, a very ethical man, in that he never introduced new doctrine. He tried to adhere strictly to Joseph Smith's teachings and never disclosed new 'revelation' whereas the LeBarons and Jeffs continually consolidated their power of their subjects with new and more radical doctrine."

Sister Wives Christine Brown is the granddaughter of Rulon Allred through his son Rex Allred.

Death 
On May 10, 1977, two women, both disguised by wigs and sunglasses, visited Allred's office in Murray, Utah, and opened fire with handguns. Only Allred was injured; he died of his wounds the same day. One of the women was later identified as Rena Chynoweth, one of LeBaron's wives. Although acquitted (Chynoweth was found not guilty in a 9-3 jury ruling), Chynoweth later confessed to the crime in her memoir, The Blood Covenant. LeBaron was eventually convicted of association with several other murders, including that of his daughter, Rebecca. 

Allred's family is the subject of two memoirs written by one of his daughters, Dorothy Allred Solomon: In My Father's House and Predators, Prey, and Other Kinfolk: Growing Up in Polygamy. Samuel W. Taylor's I Have Six Wives was based on Allred's life. Allred's niece, Irene Spencer, writes of her uncle in her memoir Shattered Dreams: My Life As A Polygamist's Wife. Spencer, now a remarried monogamist, was the second of ten wives of LeBaron's younger brother and opponent, Verlan.

See also 

 Mormon fundamentalism
 Apostolic United Brethren
 Factional breakdown: Mormon fundamentalist sects
 List of Mormon fundamentalist churches
 List of Mormon fundamentalist leaders

References

Further reading
Dorothy Allred Solomon. In My Father's House. (Franklin Watts, 1984)
Dorothy Allred Solomon. Predators, Prey, and Other Kinfolk: Growing Up in Polygamy. (W.W. Norton, 2003)
Dorothy Allred Solomon. Daughter of the Saints: Growing Up In Polygamy. (W.W. Norton, 2003).
Dorothy Allred Solomon. The Sisterhood: Inside the Lives of Mormon Women. (Palgrave Macmillan, 2007)
Irene Spencer. Shattered Dreams: My Life as a Polygamist's Wife.
Ben Bradlee, Jr. and Dale Van Atta, Prophet of Blood: The Untold Story of Ervil LeBaron and the Lambs of God (G.G. Putnam's Sons, 1981)

External links
http://dorothyallredsolomon.com
http://www.mormonfundamentalism.com/polygamous-groups/94-2/
 

1906 births
1977 deaths
American chiropractors
American homeopaths
American Latter Day Saint leaders
Apostolic United Brethren
Assassinated American people
Assassinated religious leaders
Deaths by firearm in Utah
Latter Day Saint martyrs
Mormon fundamentalist leaders
People from Salt Lake City
People murdered in Utah
Victims of religiously motivated violence in the United States